Beaver Buzz is an energy drink line produced in Canada Double D Beverage Co. (DBA DD Beverage & Nutrition) of British Columbia, under the brand of Canadian Beaver Buzz Energy. The beverages include taurine, caffeine, Siberian Ginseng, Guarana seed extract and various vitamins, and uses cane sugar instead of commonly used high fructose corn syrup. Product variations include Citrus, Green tea, Saskatoon berry, Root Beer, Black Currant, Original, Pineapple Mango, and Canadian Punch flavours. Beaver Buzz contains 180 mg caffeine in a standard 473 ml can.

The beverage is distributed by retailers in all regions of Canada and was noted in national and regional press coverage. In early 2009, the company introduced Beaver Natural Soda', a line of microbrewed non-energy soft drinks based on all  natural ingredients. Double D Beverage has now rebranded the line to Bear 'n Beaver Premium Craft Soda  The Buzz Energy brands also traded in the United Kingdom as Bulldog Buzz, and in 2008 was selected as the  official energy drink of the Batley Bulldogs team selected.

Flavours

 Saskatoon Berry - blue can
 Citrus - red can
 Root Beer - brown can
 Green Tea - light green can
 Black Currant - purple can
 Original - black can
 Canadian Punch - white can (sugar free)
 Pineapple Mango - white and red can (sugar free)

References

Drink companies of Canada
Energy drinks
Canadian brands
Cuisine of British Columbia